Sant Pau de Fontclara is a parish church and former Benedictine monastery in the village of Fontclara, Palau-sator, Girona Province, Catalonia, Spain. It was formerly dependent on Lagrasse Abbey.

Architecture and fittings
Of Romanesque design, further construction occurred to the building in the 16th and 17th centuries. Side chapels were added. It has a single nave with pointed vault and semicircular apse. The date of 1639 is recorded on the building. On the front facade, there is a bell gable with two recesses. Preserved in situ are some murals located on the arch and apse. There is a pediment with a bas relief depicting St. Paul and other paintings depicting the life of St. Paul.

Bibliography
 Pladevall, Antoni (2000). Guies Catalunya Romànica, El Baix Empordà. Barcelona Pòrtic.  (in Catalán).

External links

17th-century Roman Catholic church buildings in Spain
Roman Catholic churches completed in 1639
Benedictine monasteries in Catalonia
Buildings and structures in the Province of Girona
Romanesque architecture in Catalonia
1639 establishments in Spain